Serbia competed at the 2020 Winter Youth Olympics in Lausanne, Switzerland from 9 to 22 January 2020.

Medalists
Medals awarded to participants of mixed-NOC (Combined) teams are represented in italics. These medals are not counted towards the individual NOC medal tally.

Alpine skiing

Biathlon

Ice hockey

Short track speed skating

See also
Serbia at the 2020 Summer Olympics

References

2020 in Serbian sport
Nations at the 2020 Winter Youth Olympics
Serbia at the Youth Olympics